The 2022 Wrestling World Cup – Women's freestyle was the second Wrestling World Cup in 2022 which took place in Iowa City, United States on December 10–11, 2022.

Pool stage

Pool A 

{| class="wikitable outercollapse"
!POOL A
|-
|Round I

|-
|Round II

Pool B

Medal Matches

Final ranking

See also
2022 Wrestling World Cup - Men's freestyle
2022 Wrestling World Cup - Men's Greco-Roman

References

External links
 Official website
 Results Book

Wrestling World Cup
Freestyle wrestling
2022 in American sports
2022 in sport wrestling
2022 in women's sport wrestling
2022 in women's sport
International wrestling competitions hosted by the United States
Sports in Iowa
Wrestling in Iowa
Wrestling World Cup